The 6th Northwest Territories Legislative Council was the 13th assembly of the territorial government. It took place from 1967 and was dissolved in 1970. This was the first council that took place specifically in the capital city of Yellowknife.

Appointed members

References

External links
Northwest Territories Legislative Assembly homepage

Northwest Territories Legislative Assemblies